Enchytronia is a genus of annelids belonging to the family Enchytraeidae.

The species of this genus are found in Europe.

Species:
 Enchytronia annulata Nielsen & Christensen, 1959 
 Enchytronia baloghi Dózsa-Farkas, 1988

References

Annelids